Venus is the debut extended play by South Korean girl group Hello Venus. It was released on May 9, 2012, by Tricell Media and distributed by NHN Entertainment. "Venus" was released as the title track from the EP, and the group performed the song on  South Korean music programs, including Music Bank and Inkigayo. A music video for the title track was also released on May 9.

A repackaged version, Like a Wave, was released on July 4, 2012.

Background and release 
On April 17, 2012, Pledis Entertainment announced through their official website their new girl group called Hello Venus, the second girl group from the label after After School debuted in 2009. On April 26, the first  introductory video teaser and first image teaser were revealed, setting the stage for the release of their debut album for May 9, 2012. On May 3, a music video teaser was released, revealing the song "Venus" for the first time. It was also announced that member Yoonjo had suffered an injury and would only be participating in non dancing roles for the music video. On May 9, 2012, the music video for the title track "Venus" was released.

The EP was digitally released on May 9, 2012, through several music portals, including MelOn in South Korea, and iTunes for the global market.

Promotion 
In order to promote the mini-album, Hello Venus performed "Venus" on several South Korean music programs. They had their debut stage on Mnet's M Countdown on May 10, 2012, followed by KBS's Music Bank on May 11, MBC's Show! Music Core on May 12 and SBS's Inkigayo on May 13.

Track listing

References 

2012 EPs
2012 debut albums
Korean-language EPs
Hello Venus albums